Pseudoalteromonas peptidolytica is a marine bacterium isolated from the sea surrounding Yamato Island in the Sea of Japan.

References

External links
Type strain of Pseudoalteromonas peptidolytica at BacDive -  the Bacterial Diversity Metadatabase

Alteromonadales
Bacteria described in 2000